The French National Rugby League, known as the LNR, manages the professional rugby sector in France, by delegation of the Ministry of Youth and Sports and the French Rugby Federation.

LNR
 organises, manages and regulates the two French rugby club divisions, Top 14 and Rugby Pro D2, 
 promotes and develops the professional sector of French rugby clubs, and represents it in the management of European cups, 
 negotiates and markets the television and partnership rights of the French Rugby Championship TOP 14 and PRO D2, and 
 assures the defence of the material and moral interests of professional rugby.

Data on the ownership of LNR is not available.

LNR established a third fully professional division below Pro D2; the new league launched in the 2020–21 season.

See also
 List of rugby union clubs in France

References

External links
  Official site
  French league results
  French National Rugby League [LNR announced NFT platforms with Web3 Bamg Sports and LegendaryPlays]
  LegendaryPlays, the LNR official NFT video platform

 
Rugby union governing bodies in France